Piotr Mieszkowski, Junior (1630–1696) was a Roman Catholic prelate who served as Auxiliary Bishop of Włocławek (1678–1696) and Titular Bishop of Marocco o Marruecos (1678–1696).

Biography
Piotr Mieszkowski was born in 1630 in Poznan, Poland.
On 6 Jun 1678, he was appointed during the papacy of Pope Innocent XI as Auxiliary Bishop of Włocławek and Titular Bishop of Marocco o Marruecos.
On 20 Aug 1679, he was consecrated bishop by Stanisław Sarnowski, Bishop of Włocławek, with Stanisław Kazimierz Dąmbski, Bishop of Lutsk, and Wojciech Stawowski, Titular Bishop of Petra in Palaestina, serving as co-consecrators. 
He served as Auxiliary Bishop of Włocławek until his death in 1696.

While bishop, he was the principal co-consecrator of Tomasz Bogoria Skotnicki, Auxiliary Bishop of Chelmno and Titular Bishop of Lycopolis (1686) .

References

External links and additional sources
 (for Chronology of Bishops) 
 (for Chronology of Bishops)  
 (for Chronology of Bishops) 
 (for Chronology of Bishops)  

17th-century Roman Catholic bishops in the Polish–Lithuanian Commonwealth
Bishops appointed by Pope Innocent XI
1630 births
1696 deaths